The Hillman Minx was a mid-sized family car that British car maker Hillman produced from 1931 to 1970. There were many versions of the Minx over that period, as well as badge-engineered variants sold by Humber, Singer, and Sunbeam.

From the mid-1950s to the mid-1960s, the Minx and its derivatives were the greatest-volume sellers of the "Audax" family of cars from Rootes, which also included the Singer Gazelle and Sunbeam Rapier. The final version of the Minx was the "New Minx" launched in 1967, which was part of the "Arrow" family and essentially a basic version of the Hillman Hunter. Generally, the Minx was available in four-door saloon and estate forms, with a 1496-cc engine.

The Hillman Super Minx was a slightly larger model offered during the Audax era.

Throughout the life of the Minx, there was usually an estate version—and, from 1954 to 1965, a short-wheelbase estate, the Hillman Husky, and a van derivative known as the Commer Cob.

The Minx model name was revived briefly – along with the "Rapier" name, as applied to the Sunbeam Rapier version of the Audax family – as a special edition late in the life of the Talbot Alpine / Talbot Solara cars, produced by Chrysler Europe after its takeover of the Rootes Group.

Pre-WWII Minx

The original Minx was announced to the forewarned (in August) public 1 October 1931. It was straightforward and conventional with a pressed-steel body on separate chassis and 30 bhp 1185 cc engine producing cushioned power. It was upgraded with a four-speed transmission in 1934 and a styling upgrade, most noticeably a slightly V-shaped grille. For 1935 the range was similar except that synchromesh was added to all forward gears and this Minx became the first mass-produced car with an all-synchromesh gearbox. it was designed by Rootes' technical director Captain John Samuel Irving (1880-1953), designer of Sunbeam aero engines and Sunbeam's Golden Arrow' in conjunction with Alfred Herbert Wilde (1891–1930), recently chief engineer of Standard and designer of the Standard Nine.

The 1936 model had a new name, the Minx Magnificent, and a restyle with a much more rounded body. The chassis was stiffened and the engine moved forwards to give more passenger room. The rear panel, previously vertical, was now set at a sloping angle, and the manufacturers offered the option of a folding luggage grid attached to the rear panel for "two pounds, seven shillings and sixpence" (slightly under £2.40) painted. A Commer-badged estate car was added to the range.

The final pre-war model was the 1938 Minx. There were no more factory-built tourers but some were made by Carbodies. The car was visually similar to the Magnificent, with a different grille, and access to the luggage boot (trunk) was external (that on the predecessor was accessed by folding down the rear seat). There were two saloon models in the range, the basic "Safety" model with simple rexine trim instead of leather, no opening front quarter lights, and less luxurious trim levels. The De Luxe model had leather trim, opening quarter lights, extra trim pads, and various other comfort benefits. The 1938 model was not the final iteration before the outbreak of war, however, as the 1939 model was considerably different mechanically, with virtually the entire drivetrain improved to the extent that few parts are interchangeable with the 1938 model. This includes gearbox, differential, half shafts, steering box, and a great many other mechanical and cosmetic changes. Even the front grille, which to the casual eye looks almost identical to the 1938 model, became a pressed alloy component rather than a composite.

Wartime Minx

During the Second World War, British car companies produced simple Utility load carriers, the Car, Light Utility or "Tilly" which was later developed into the experimental Hillman Gnat. For Hillman it was the Hillman 10HP, a Minx chassis with a two-person cab and covered load area behind. The basic saloon was also produced for military and essential civilian use from 1940 to 1944.

Operators
: British Army, RAF

Minx Mark I to VIII (1945–57)

The Minx sold between 1945 and 1947 had the same 1185 cc side-valve engine, the same wheelbase and virtually the same shape as the prewar Minx. This postwar Minx became known as the Minx Mark I (or Minx Phase I). This was the first Minx with a protruding boot (trunk) that nodded to the Ponton, three-box design by then replacing the 'flat back' look, inherited from models that had debuted in the 1930s. Between 1947 and 1948, Hillman offered a modified version they called the Minx Mark II.

A much more modern-looking Minx, the Mark III, was sold from 1948. Three different body styles were offered initially, these being saloon, estate car and drophead coupé (convertible). Beneath the metal, however, and apart from updated front suspension, little had changed: the Mark III retained the 1185 cc side-valve engine of its predecessor. The test car cost £505 including taxes, the price including radio (£36), over-riders (£5) and heater (£18).

The Mark V, introduced in 1951, featured side chromium trim and a floor-mounted handbrake.

The Mark VI of 1953 featured a new grille, revised combustion chambers and a two-spoke steering wheel. A fourth body variation was added, badged as the Hillman Minx Californian, a two-door hard-top coupé with, slightly unusually, a b-pillar that wound down out of sight along with the rear side window to give an unbroken window line when all windows were fully opened: the rear window assembly was of a three-piece wrap-around form. The wheelbase and overall length of the car remained the same as those of the four-door saloon and convertible permutations. The Mark VII, also introduced in 1953, featured longer rear mudguards and a bigger boot. For the Mark VIII, in 1954, a new ohv 1390 cc engine was installed. This engine, two years later, went into the first of the new "Audax series" Minxes.

For a short time in the early 1950s, Hillman Minxes were sold in the US to Americans seeking better gas mileage. American reviews of the vehicle were lukewarm.  Between 1953 and 1956 the Mark VI to Mark VIII Isuzu Hillman Minx was produced in Japan by Isuzu Motors, prior to their 1961 introduction of the Bellel.

A 2-door coupé utility variant of the Minx Mark VIII was produced by Rootes Australia as the Hillman de luxe Utility, circa 1956.

Audax design Hillman Minx (Series I to Series VI, 1956–67)

The Audax body was designed by the Rootes Group, but helped by the Raymond Loewy design organisation, who were involved in the design of Studebaker coupés in 1953. Announced in May 1956 the car went through a succession of annual facelifts each given a series number, replacing the mark number used on the previous Minxes. The Series I, introduced in 1956, was followed by the Series II in 1957, the Series III in 1958, the Series IIIA in 1959, the Series IIIB in 1960, the Series IIIC in 1961, the Series V in 1963 and the Series VI in 1965. There was no Series IV. Over the years the engine was increased in capacity from 1390 cc (in the Series I and II) to 1725 cc in the Series VI. A variety of manual transmissions, with column or floor change, and automatic transmissions were offered. For the automatic version, the Series I and Series II used a Lockheed Manumatic two-pedal system (really only a semi-automatic), the Series III a Smiths Easidrive, which was the first production Dual-clutch transmission, while the V/VI a Borg Warner. The Series VI was fitted with an all-synchromesh gearbox.

The test car cost £794 including taxes of £265.

There were Singer Gazelle and Sunbeam Rapier variants of all these Hillman Minx models and the names were again used on derivatives in the later Rootes Arrow range. Some models were re-badged in certain markets, with the Sunbeam and Humber marques used for some exports.

The New Zealand importer/assembler Todd Motors created the Humber 80 and Humber 90, badge-engineered models based respectively on the Minx and Super Minx, both as a way to secure scarce additional import licences for CKD assembly kits and to give Humber dealers a smaller car to sell alongside the locally assembled Hawk and Super Snipe. Although the 90 was identical to the Super Minx apart from badging, the cheaper 80 featured a horizontal bar grille design. The Humber 80 was acknowledged in the 1980s Roger Hall play Prisoners of Mother England, in which a newly arrived immigrant in New Zealand spots one and exclaims: "Humber 80? There's no such car!"

In Australia, a Series Va model was released in 1965. It was fitted with a more powerful 1592cc engine and the all-synchromesh gearbox destined for the forthcoming Series VI model.

The Audax Minx was also built in Japan by Isuzu Motors as the Isuzu Hillman Minx under licence from Rootes between September 1956 and June 1964. Isuzu produced their own unique estate car version, the Isuzu Hillman Express, from 1958 to 1964.

Super Minx (1961–67)

Launched late in 1961, the Hillman Super Minx was intended at one stage to replace the Minx Series III.  In the event the Series III would be replaced in 1963 by the Series V, while the Super Minx was launched as a separate, albeit closely related, model.

New Minx (1967–70)

A replacement Minx (sometimes identified, retrospectively, as the New Minx) took over from the Series VI in 1967.  It was a reduced specification version of the Hillman Hunter. Saloon and estate versions were produced, initially equipped with a 54 bhp 1496 cc 4 cylinder engine. A 61 bhp 1725cc engine became available in 1968. The final Minx was replaced by a Hillman Hunter De Luxe model in 1970.

Models

Scale Models

Meccano Dinky Toys; No. 154 (production 1954–58), Minx Mark I to VIII (1945–57) approximately O scale (1:44).
Meccano Dinky Toys; No. 175 (production 1958–61), Hillman Minx Series I approximately O scale (1:44).
Triang Spot-On Hillman Minx Series V 1:42 scale

Explanatory notes

References

External links

 Hillman range for 1939 sales brochure
 Isuzu's first Minx Mark VI off the assembly line
 Hillman Minx website
 Rootes-Chrysler website

Minx
Rear-wheel-drive vehicles
Cars introduced in 1931
1940s cars
1950s cars
1960s cars
1970s cars
Station wagons
Sedans